A photograph is an image created by the effect of light on a light-sensitive material.

Photograph or photo may also refer to:

Films
 The Photograph (2007 film), an Indonesian film
 Photograph (film), a 2019 Indian-American film by Ritesh Batra
 The Photograph (2020 film), an upcoming American romantic drama

Music
 The Photos, a British power pop act of the early 1980s

Albums
 Photograph: The Very Best of Ringo Starr
 Photographs (Patrick Sky album), 1969
 Photograph (Melanie album), 1976
 Photographs (Casiopea album), 1983
 Photograph (Ariel Rivera album), 1995
 Photographs (Andrew Osenga album), 2002
 Photographs (Mest album), 2005
 Photographs (EP), by Lakes, 2006
 Photograph, by Jani Lane, 2007
 Photographs, by The Aston Shuffle

Songs
 "Photograph" (Antônio Carlos Jobim song), 1959
 "Photograph" (Def Leppard song), 1983
 "Photograph" (Ed Sheeran song), 2015
 "Photograph" (J. Cole song), 2018
 "Photograph" (Nickelback song), 2005
 "Photograph" (Ringo Starr song), 1973
 "Photo" (Ryan Cabrera song), 2005
 "Photograph" (The Verve Pipe song), 1996
 "Photograph" (Weezer song), 2001
 "Photographs", by Janis Ian from Night Rains
 "Photographs", by Eddie Vedder from the soundtrack album Into the Wild
 "Photo", by Karan Shembi from the film Luka Chuppi
 "Photograph", by The Outfield from the album Any Time Now
 "Photograph", by R.E.M. featuring Natalie Merchant from the album Born to Choose
 "Photographs", by Rihanna from the album Rated R

Printed media
 Photo (American magazine), a men's magazine, published during the 1950s
 Photo (French magazine), about photography, published since 1967
 Photograph (book), a 2013 photography book by Ringo Starr
 The Photograph (novel), a 2003 novel by Penelope Lively

Software
 Photos (Apple), photo management software included in Apple Inc. operating systems
 Microsoft Photos, photo management software included in Microsoft Windows operating systems

Other uses
 Digital photography, uses digital technology to capture an image electronically
 Photographs (video game), a 2019 puzzle game by British developer Luca Redwood 
 photo-, the Greek prefix denoting light beams

See also
 Photographer (disambiguation)